Ariel S. Leve (born January 24, 1968) is an American author and award-winning journalist. She was a columnist for The Guardian and subsequently for the Sunday Times Magazine. Her memoir An Abbreviated Life was published by HarperCollins in 2016.

Early life 
Ariel Leve was born in New York City and grew up with her mother, Sandra Hochman, a poet, in Manhattan. At age five she began traveling to Southeast Asia, where she spent part of the year living in Bangkok, Thailand, with her father.

Career
Leve was a senior writer for The London Sunday Times Magazine from 2003-2010. She has contributed frequently to The Guardian, and has written for The New York Times, The New York Times Book Review, Esquire Magazine, Vanity Fair Magazine, Men’s Journal, The Wall Street Journal Magazine, The Financial Times Magazine, The Sunday Telegraph Magazine, The Sunday Times Style Magazine, Marie Claire, Elle, Psychologies, Vogue (U.K.), Granta and others.

Leve has written a number of profiles and cover stories, including the June 2016 Esquire Magazine cover story on the actor Liev Schreiber. She has appeared as a guest on WTF with Marc Maron and given a TED talk on gaslighting.

From October 2005 to January 2010 Leve wrote the weekly humor column "Cassandra" for the Sunday Times Magazine. Prior to that, the column ran in The Guardian  under the title "Half Empty". From 2010 - 2012 Leve wrote a monthly food column for Guardian called The Fussy Eater.

Books 
Leve's first book, titled It Could Be Worse, You Could Be Me in the US and The Cassandra Chronicles in the UK, was a collection of her "Cassandra” columns from The Sunday Times Magazine. It was published in August 2009. Leve's television pilot of "It Could Be Worse, You Could Be Me" was optioned by Cineflix Studios

Her second book, 1963: The Year of the Revolution, co-authored by Robin Morgan recounts the story of the rise of the Youthquake movement in 1963. Leve and Morgan detail how young people became a significant commercial and cultural force for the first time. The book includes interviews with prominent figures from the movement, including Eric Clapton, Keith Richards, Bill Wyman, Mary Quant, Patti Boyd, Andrew Loog Oldham, Neil Sedaka and Carly Simon.

Leve's third book, An Abbreviated Life, was published in June 2016. A memoir of her early years, it explores the psychological consequences of a traumatic childhood and the aftermath of survival.  The memoir received positive reviews in The New York Times, The Guardian, The Spectator and others.

Awards
In 2005, she was nominated for the British Press Awards for Interviewer of the Year for 2004.

In 2008, she was nominated for the British Press Awards for Feature Writer of the Year for 2007.

In 2008, she won Feature Writer of the Year from the Magazine Design and Journalism Awards.

In 2010, she was nominated for the British Press Awards for Interviewer of the year for 2009, and was "Highly Commended.

References

External links 
Official website: ariel-leve.com

British journalists
The Sunday Times people
1968 births
Living people